Regis High School is a private Roman Catholic high school in Stayton, Oregon, United States. It is located in the Roman Catholic Archdiocese of Portland. Regis High School is one of two Catholic high schools in Marion County.

Academics

Regis has been accredited through the Northwest Accreditation Commission since 1966.

Notable alumni
 Travis Lulay football player
 Cliff Bentz Congressman

References

Catholic secondary schools in Oregon
High schools in Marion County, Oregon
Educational institutions established in 1963
Schools accredited by the Northwest Accreditation Commission
1963 establishments in Oregon
Stayton, Oregon
Roman Catholic Archdiocese of Portland in Oregon